The Oman Fed Cup team represent Oman in Fed Cup tennis competition and are governed by the Oman Tennis Association. They have not competed since 2018.

History
Oman competed in its first Fed Cup in 2011. Their best result have been the Asia / Oceania Group II 7th-8th Playoffs.

See also
Fed Cup
Oman Davis Cup team

External links

Billie Jean King Cup teams
Fed Cup
Fed Cup